Paul Mounsey (born 15 April 1959) is a Scottish musician, composer, arranger and record producer.

A graduate of Trinity College, London, where he studied with Richard Arnell, Mounsey has composed for film, television, theatre, and television commercials, as well as the concert hall and the Latin American pop market. He has written pop hits for Mexican boy bands, received commissions for concert and multimedia works, lived with and recorded the music of indigenous communities in the Amazon rainforest, and to date released five solo albums. He is currently based in Los Angeles, California, United States, working as composer, orchestrator and programmer in the film industry.

Discography

Solo albums 
To date, Paul Mounsey has released five solo albums:
 Nahoo (1994)
 NahooToo (1997)
 Nahoo 3 – Notes from the Republic (1999)
 City of Walls (2003)
 Tha Na Laithean a' Dol Seachad (The Days Flash Past) (2005)

With Runrig 
 Proterra (2003)

References 
 Folk World magazine
 All Celtic Music article
 BDi Music composer profile

External links 
 
 BDi Music Composer Biography
 Planeta Musical Sur
 Folk World interview
 Green Man Review
 [ allmusic entry]

Celtic fusion musicians
1959 births
Living people
Scottish keyboardists
Scottish composers
Scottish songwriters
Scottish record producers
20th-century Scottish male singers
British music arrangers
British male songwriters